Milik  (formerly Mikowa) is a village in the administrative district of Gmina Muszyna, within Nowy Sącz County, Lesser Poland Voivodeship, in southern Poland, close to the border with Slovakia. It is located in the valley of the Milik river — a tributary of the Poprad.

The village has a population of 700.

References

Villages in Nowy Sącz County